Abrahamsson is a patronymic Swedish surname. Notable people with the surname include:

Erik Abrahamsson (1898–1965), Swedish athlete
Göran Abrahamsson
Josefin Abrahamsson (born 1979), Swedish table tennis player
Maria Abrahamsson
Thommy Abrahamsson (born 1947), Swedish ice hockey defenceman
Vilma Abrahamsson (born 1999), Swedish football player

Patronymic surnames
Swedish-language surnames